Sulín (Sulyn) is a village and municipality in Stará Ľubovňa District in the Prešov Region of northern Slovakia.

History
In historical records the village was first mentioned in 1960.

A more detailed history with photographs can be found at....

Sulín - The Carpathian Connection

Geography
The municipality lies at an altitude of 425 metres and covers an area of 20.098 km². It has a population of about 414 people.

Villages and municipalities in Stará Ľubovňa District
Šariš